Owen Hargrave Suffolk (4 April 1829 – ? ) was an Australian bushranger, poet, confidence-man and author of Days of Crime and Years of Suffering (1867).

Early life
Owen Henry Suffolk was born on 4 April 1829 in comfortable circumstances in Finchley, Middlesex, Suffolk was sent to sea as a youth when his father, a London merchant, was ruined.

Crime, imprisonment and transportation
On his return Suffolk found himself homeless and fell into a life of crime. Charged with stealing in 1844, he was sentenced to a year’s detention. He was then convicted of forgery in 1846 serving time in Newgate, Millbank and Coldbath Fields prisons before being transported on the convict ship the Joseph Soames in 1847. In Victoria, Australia by his own account he led a colorful life as a bushman, bushranger thief, prison identity and repeat offender. In his third period of incarceration commencing in 1858 he began his autobiography.

In July, 1866, Suffolk received a ticket of leave, his third in Victoria, and a full pardon on board the Norfolk bound for London on 20 September 1866. This pardon (in the possession of the National Museum of Australia) was conditional on his not returning to Australia. Suffolk thus obtained the neat distinction of having twice been made an exile. His story published in the Australasian newspaper in 1867 was well-written, racy and a powerful account of criminal and prison life by an insider, one that squared well with the popular fiction of the day. His account of family misfortune, ill-treatment at school and at sea, subsequent misadventures, romantic interludes and descent into vagrancy and crime in London, reads like a misplaced Charles Dickens plot. In Australia he tells of his youthful infatuation with crime, bush ranging and difficulties in finding honest work, and the hardships, injustices and folklore of prison life.

Back in England he quickly resumed his old habits as a confidence-man, swindler and thief and added bigamist and deceiver of women. In March, 1867, he married a widow, Mary Elizabeth Phelps, in London. In August 1868 Owen Suffolk, 'a journalist', appeared before Lord Chief Justice Sir Alexander Cockburn at Ipswich charged with stealing a black mare and carriage belonging to the landlady of the Great White Horse Hotel and obtaining ten pounds by false pretences. Suffolk begged for mercy on account of his de facto wife, aged 19, who was his brother's child, and her infant. The judge rejected the marriage as bigamous and sentenced Suffolk to 15 years penal servitude. By 1880 he had been released from prison and on 4 August married Eliza Shreves at St Lukes Church in the parish of St Marylebone in London.

Suffolk began to scheme to fake his own death, he set it up by spending his spare time, a lot because he wasn't working, rowing on the Thames. One day, when he was out boating with two others, the boat capsized and his companions were found exhausted and bedraggled on the river bank but Suffolk had drowned. Various newspaper offices were supplied with the information, headed, "Melancholy accident to an Australian gentleman." Later, It was discovered that the information had been written by the victim himself, who, by the time of the discovery, was on his way across the Atlantic, with his wife's money.

He was last heard of in New York.

Writer
Suffolk is remembered as Victoria's 'prison poet' and for his readable autobiography "Days of Crime and Years of Suffering" which reveals much about London street life and the behaviour and treatment of criminals in the Victorian era. An important contribution to Australian literature it influenced Marcus Clarke and his novel His Natural Life.

See also
List of convicts transported to Australia

References 

 Owen Suffolk's Days of Crime and Years of Suffering, edited and introduced by David Dunstan, Australian Scholarly Publishing, Melbourne, 2000.

1829 births
Bushrangers
Australian memoirists
Convicts transported to Australia
People from Finchley
Year of death unknown